Sir Ben Kingsley is an English actor who has received and been nominated for various awards through his career, which include an Oscar, two BAFTAs, two Golden Globes and a Grammy. He also received a star on the Hollywood Walk of Fame in 2010.

Awards and nominations

Notes

References

External links 
 

Kingsley, Ben